Diplospinifer is a genus of worms belonging to the family Polymorphidae.

Species:
 Diplospinifer serpenticola Fukui, 1929

References

Polymorphidae
Acanthocephala genera